1944 : British Military Mission-BMME (Addis Abeba)
1945–47 : no competition
1948 : Key Baher (Addis Abeba)
1949 : Army (Addis Abeba)
1950 : Saint George SC (Addis Abeba)
1951 : Army (Addis Abeba)
1952 : Army (Addis Abeba)
1953 : Army (Addis Abeba)
1954 : Army (Addis Abeba)
1955 : Hamassien (Asmara)
1956 : Mechal (Addis Abeba)
1957 : Hamassien (Asmara)
1958 : Akale Guzay (Eritrea)
1959 : Tele SC
1960 : Cotton FC
1961 : Ethio-Cement (Dire Dawa)
1962 : Cotton FC
1963 : Cotton FC
1964 : Ethio-Cement (Dire Dawa)
1965 : Cotton FC
1966 : Saint George SC (Addis Abeba)
1967 : Saint George SC (Addis Abeba)
1968 : Saint George SC (Addis Abeba)
1969 : Tele SC
1970 : Tele SC
1971 : Saint George SC (Addis Abeba)
1972 : Asmara (Asmara)
1973 : Asmara (Asmara)
1974 : Embassoria (Eritrea)
1975 : Saint George SC (Addis Abeba)
1976 : Mechal (Addis Abeba)
1977 : Medr Babur (Dire Dawa)
1978 : Ogaden Anbassa (Harar)
1979 : Omedla (Addis Abeba)
1980 : Tegl Fre (Addis Abeba)
1981 : Ermejachen (Addis Abeba)
1982 : Mechal (Addis Abeba)
1983 : Cotton FC
1984 : Mechal (Addis Abeba)
1985 : Brewery (Addis Abeba)
1986 : Brewery (Addis Abeba)
1987 : Saint George SC (Addis Abeba)
1988 : Mechal (Addis Abeba)
1989 : Mechal (Addis Abeba)
1990 : Brewery (Addis Abeba)
1991 : Saint George SC (Addis Abeba)
1992 : Saint George SC (Addis Abeba)
1993 : EEPCO (Addis Abeba)
1994 : Saint George SC (Addis Abeba)
1995 : Saint George SC (Addis Abeba)
1996 : Saint George SC (Addis Abeba)
1997 : Ethiopian Coffee (Addis Abeba)
1997–98 : EEPCO (Addis Abeba)
1998–99 : Saint George SC (Addis Abeba)
1999–00 : Saint George SC (Addis Abeba)
2000–01 : EEPCO (Addis Abeba)
2001–02 : Saint George SC (Addis Abeba)
2002–03 : Saint George SC (Addis Abeba)
2003–04 : Awassa City (Awassa)
2004–05 : Saint George SC (Addis Abeba)
2005–06 : Saint George SC (Addis Abeba)
2006–07 : Awassa City (Awassa)
2007–08 : Saint George SC (Addis Abeba)
2008–09 : Saint George SC (Addis Abeba)
2009–10 : Saint George SC (Addis Abeba)
2010–11 : Ethiopian Coffee (Addis Abeba)
2011–12 : Saint George SC (Addis Abeba)
2012–13 : Dedebit (Addis Abeba)
2013–14 : Saint George SC (Addis Abeba)
2014–15 : Saint George SC (Addis Abeba)
2015–16 : Saint George SC (Addis Abeba)
2016–17 : Saint George SC (Addis Abeba)
2017–18 : Jimma Aba Jifar F.C. (Jimma)
2018–19 : Mekelle 70 Enderta F.C. (Mekelle)
2019–20 : Null and Void (COVID-19)

References 

·2020-21:Fasil Kenema (Gondar)

Football in Ethiopia